The 2014 Florida Winter Series season was the inaugural and only season for the Florida Winter Series, a non-championship racing series organised by the Ferrari Driver Academy in Florida. The season started with a collective test on 22 January 2014 at Homestead-Miami Speedway, before a total of 12 races were held over 4 race meetings at Sebring International Raceway, Palm Beach International Raceway and Homestead-Miami Speedway.

One of the Academy's driver roster, Formula Renault 2.0 Alps competitor Antonio Fuoco, was one of two drivers to win four races along with Nicholas Latifi, who had contested the FIA European Formula Three Championship in 2013. KZ1 karting world champion Max Verstappen won races at Palm Beach and Homestead, as he contested his first single-seater races prior to a campaign in the FIA European Formula Three Championship with Van Amersfoort Racing, while Dennis van de Laar and Tatiana Calderón each won races at Sebring, as they also prepared for their respective FIA European Formula Three Championship campaigns.

The series used the Tatuus FA010B chassis. This car is also used in Formula Abarth and other regional championships. The car is built to Formula 3 safety regulations to ensure the drivers safety. The car is powered by a 1400cc Fiat-FPT engine producing 190hp.

Drivers

Race calendar and results
All rounds were held in Florida, United States.

Results
All races were non-championship, with no points awarded.

† — Drivers did not finish the race, but were classified as they completed over 90% of the race distance.

Notes

References

External links
 

Florida Winter Series
Florida Winter Series season
Florida Winter Series season
Florida Winter Series season
Homestead, Florida
Jupiter, Florida
Motorsport competitions in Florida
Sebring, Florida
Sports in Miami-Dade County, Florida
Sports in Palm Beach County, Florida
Florida Winter Series